The 1955–56 Copa México was the 40th edition of the Copa México and the 13th staging in the professional era.

The competition started on April 7, 1956, and concluded on May 27, 1956, with the Final, held at the Estadio Olímpico de la Ciudad de los Deportes in Mexico City, in which Toluca defeated Irapuato 2–1 to win the club's first cup title.

First round

|}

Final round

Final

References

Copa MX
1955–56 in Mexican football
1956 domestic association football cups